The first player ever to score a hat-trick (three or more goals in a match) for India in an international football match was R. Lumsden. He achieved the feat in an official friendly match against Australia on 24 September 1938, at the Sydney Showground, although India lost the match 4–5. This is the only instance when India have lost a game in which a player scored a hat-trick for the team. Lumsden was the only footballer to score a hat-trick for India before independence. Since independence in 1947, ten Indian players have scored a hat-trick in an international football match. No Indian player has ever scored more than three goals in a single game. The first player after independence to score a hat-trick for India was Sheoo Mewalal in a 4–0 victory over Burma in the 1952  Colombo Quadrangular Tournament.

K. Appalaraju and Sunil Chhetri are the only Indian footballers to have scored a hat-trick more than once. Appalaraju achieved the feat twice in the two-legged tie against Ceylon during the 1964 Olympic Qualifiers. Chhetri has achieved the feat three times, the latest of which came in India's 5–0 victory over Chinese Taipei in the opening match of the 2018 Intercontinental Cup. This is also the most recent instance of an Indian player scoring a hat-trick in an international football match. Chhetri's first hat-trick came in the final of the 2008 AFC Challenge Cup against Tajikistan, which helped India not only to win the cup but also to qualify directly for the AFC Asian Cup in 2011, the first time in 27 years that the team reached the final tournament.

Neville D'Souza was the first Asian to score a hat-trick in the history of Olympic football. He achieved the feat in a 4–2 victory over Australia at the 1956 Melbourne Olympics. With four goals in three matches, he not only finished the tournament as joint top-scorer but also helped India become the first Asian team to reach the semi-finals of the tournament. Shabbir Ali scored the fastest hat-trick for the national team. He achieved the feat in a 3−1 victory over Indonesia on 16 August 1976, at the 1976 Merdeka Tournament. His goals came at the 7th, 33rd and 35th minutes of the match.

As of 29 March 2021, India have conceded fourteen hat-tricks, the most recent being three goals scored by Ali Mabkhout in a 0–6 defeat by the United Arab Emirates in a friendly match. Branko Zebec was the first player to score a hat-trick against India, scoring four times for Yugoslavia in the 1952 Helsinki Olympics. Two other players, Bader Al-Mutawa of Kuwait in a friendly fixture and Ismail Abdullatif of Bahrain in the 2011 AFC Asian Cup, have scored four goals against India. The only instance of India not losing a game even after conceding a hat-trick occurred against Yemen in a 2002 FIFA World Cup qualification match on 4 May 2001, which ended in a 3–3 draw.

Hat-tricks for India
, eleven players have scored a hat-trick for the national team.
Only FIFA-recognized international matches by the India national football team have been considered in the following list.
Result in the table lists India's goal tally first

Hat-tricks conceded by India
, India have conceded fourteen hat-tricks in total.
Result in the table lists India's goal tally first

See also 

History of the India national football team
India national football team at the Olympics
India national football team at the FIFA World Cup qualification
India at the AFC Asian Cup

References

External links
 
 
 
 
 
 
 

India
India
Hat-tricks
hat-tricks